Charlotte Jean Macdonald,  is a New Zealand historian. After studying as an undergraduate at Massey University, she earned her PhD from University of Auckland and is now a professor at Victoria University of Wellington.

Early life
Macdonald has a Bachelor of Arts (Honours) from Massey University, and a Doctor of Philosophy from the University of Auckland. The title of her 1986 doctoral thesis was Single Women as Immigrant Settlers in New Zealand, 1853–1871.

Professional career
Macdonald is a professor of history at Victoria University of Wellington. Her areas of expertise include: 19th century colonies and empires; New Zealand history; gender and women's history; and cultural history of bodies, modernity, sport and spectating. Her work has been marked by innovative approaches to historical research methodology and story-telling. For example, in her 1990 book A Woman of Good Character, she analysed the data connected to the lives of over 4,000 women, in combination with more conventional historical archival work, to understand a large migrant group: single women who came to New Zealand in the 19th century. She has also edited a number of collections of New Zealand women's historical primary material, greatly increasing the availability of such material.

Macdonald wrote the Te Ara – Encyclopedia of New Zealand entry on "Women and Men" in New Zealand history.

Macdonald was awarded a Marsden Fund grant in 2014 for a project entitled "Tinker, Tailor, Soldier, Settler: Garrison and Empire in the Nineteenth Century", which has developed into the Soldiers of Empire project. She was made a Fellow of the Royal Society of New Zealand Te Apārangi in 2017.

Selected works
 A Woman of Good Character: Single Women as Immigrant Settlers in Nineteenth-century New Zealand Allen & Unwin, 1990. 
 The Book of New Zealand Women / Ko kui ma te kaupapa with Merimeri Penfold, Bridget Williams Books, 1991. 
 The Vote, the Pill and the Demon Drink: A History of Feminist Writing in New Zealand, 1869–1993, Bridget Williams Books, 1993. 
 Women in History (editor, with Barbara Brookes and Margaret Tennant), Bridget Williams Books, 1992. 
My Hand Will Write What my Heart Dictates, The Unsettled Lives of Women in Nineteenth-Century New Zealand, Bridget Williams Books, 1996. (editor, with Frances Porter), 
Women and Crime in New Zealand Society 1888–1910 BA (hons) thesis, Massey University.

References

External links
 Google Scholar profile 
 Institutional homepage

20th-century New Zealand historians
21st-century New Zealand historians
Fellows of the Royal Society of New Zealand
Living people
Massey University alumni
New Zealand women historians
University of Auckland alumni
Academic staff of the Victoria University of Wellington
Year of birth missing (living people)
Recipients of Marsden grants